WKSI-FM is a Contemporary Hit Radio formatted broadcast radio station licensed to Stephens City, Virginia, serving the Northern Shenandoah Valley of Virginia and the Eastern Panhandle of West Virginia.  WKSI-FM is owned and operated by iHeartMedia, Inc.

History
98.3 FM signed on August 28, 1967 as WZFM, a local station serving Charles Town, West Virginia. The station was co-owned with WXVA (1550 AM) by Arthur W. Arundel, who at the time owned WAVA Arlington and the Leesburg-based Loudoun Times-Mirror newspaper. WZFM simulcast WXVA's broadcasting day, which was Full Service with blocks of country music.

The two stations were sold in 1970 to electrical engineer John P. Luce. The simulcast split around this time as the AM side was switched to Top 40 and the FM station went to full-time country.

Luce sold to Heritage Broadcasting Corporation in September 1982. Heritage changed the callsign to WXVA-FM after taking control. After an initial return to simulcasting 1550 AM (which had flipped to middle-of-the-road) immediately after the change, the station settled on light Adult contemporary around 1986.

In 1993, another format change took place, this time to oldies. Unusually for an FM station, Broadcasting Yearbook reported that it operated 19 hours a day – signing off between midnight and 5 a.m. A flip back to country as "Xtra Country 98" took place in late 1995. The station remained in Charles Town, but was a rimshot to Winchester, regularly showing up in the ratings there despite competition from local country stalwart WUSQ-FM.

Clear Channel (now iHeartMedia) bought WXVA-FM from Heritage in 2000. As it already owned WUSQ-FM, it sought to tap the larger Winchester market with a different format instead of competing with itself. On December 10, 2003, Clear Channel applied to move the transmitter to WUSQ-FM's site near Round Hill, Frederick County, Virginia, changing the city of license from Charles Town to Stephens City. The station immediately began stunting as "Christmas 98.3" with Christmas music and spots advising listeners to tune to WUSQ-FM for country. The flip to CHR as "Kiss 98.3" WKSI-FM came on December 26, although the physical move was not completed until late 2004.

HD2 subchannel

On August 22, 2013, WKSI began simulcasting its HD2 signal on newly acquired translator W239BV, broadcasting on 95.7, from WKSI's tower west of Winchester.  The HD2 signal aired the "Today's Mix" format, one of iHeartMedia Premium Choice formats.

On November 1, 2013 W239BV switched its format from Hot Adult Contemporary to a seasonal All-Christmas music format, with the "Mix 95-7" branding remaining.

Until December 26, 2020, at 12 Midnight, when W239BV took over the Classic Country format, which had been abandoned by crosstown competitor WXBN ahead of sister-station WINC-FM's sale and format change, as "Classic Country 95-7".

References

External links
Kiss 98-3 Online

1966 establishments in Virginia
Contemporary hit radio stations in the United States
Radio stations established in 1966
KSI-FM
IHeartMedia radio stations